John Egerton may refer to:

 Sir John Egerton (died 1614) (1551–1614), English MP for Staffordshire and Lichfield
 John Egerton, 1st Earl of Bridgewater (1579–1649), English peer and politician
 John Egerton, 2nd Earl of Bridgewater (1623–1686), English nobleman
 John Egerton, 3rd Earl of Bridgewater (1646–1701)
 John Egerton, 2nd Duke of Bridgewater (1727–1748), British peer and politician
 John Egerton, 7th Earl of Bridgewater (1753–1823), British soldier and Tory politician
 John Egerton, Viscount Alford (1812–1851), British Tory Member of Parliament
 John Egerton, 4th Earl of Ellesmere (1872–1944), British peer and soldier
 John Egerton, 6th Duke of Sutherland (1915–2000), his son
 John Egerton (bishop) (1721–1787), Anglican bishop
 John Egerton (journalist) (1935–2013), American journalist
 Sir John Grey Egerton, 8th Baronet (1766–1825), British MP for Chester